Uprising is an album by New Zealand drum and bass group Concord Dawn, released in 2003. Classed as their most popular album, it features other New Zealand musicians such as Scribe and Salmonella Dub's front man Tiki and DJ Optiv.

Track listing 
"Morning Light"
"Tonite"
"Get Ready" featuring Scribe
"Ninja"
"Raining Blood" (Slayer cover)
"Don't Tell Me" featuring Tiki and MC Jizzla
"Aurora"
"Horror Show"
"Let It Go"
"Scimitar"
"Zulu" featuring Optiv

The song Tonite has been remixed by Australian drum and bass band Pendulum.

References 

Uprising Records :: RISE001CD :: Uprising. rolldabeats. Retrieved on 23 September 2008.

Concord Dawn albums
2003 albums